Toon is a 2016 Dutch-language comedy television series created by Dirk van Pelt, Beer ten Kate and Joep Vermolen, and starring Loulou Hameleers, Amy van der Weerden and Joep Vermolen. The plot revolves around Toon (Joep Vermolen), a jingle writer who becomes famous after performing an impromptu song with his friend Nina (Amy van der Weerden) that becomes a viral hit. Soon, Toon's sister becomes their manager and starts to promote the duo. Fame throws them into the unfamiliar world of show business.

Cast
 Joep Vermolen as Toon
 Loulou Hameleers as Elise
 Amy van der Weerden as Nina
 Robbert Bleij as Robbie
 Arend Brandligt as Dylan
 Marijn Klaver as Ab
 Bart Rijnink as Ricardo
 Hanna van Vliet as Becky

Release
Toon was released on April 22, 2016 on KPN, and was later released worldwide on Netflix.

References

External links
 

2010s comedy television series
Dutch-language television shows
2016 Dutch television series debuts
2017 Dutch television series endings
2010s Dutch television series